Jamshid Fani was an Iranian boxer. He competed in the men's featherweight event at the 1948 Summer Olympics. At the 1948 Summer Olympics, he lost to Armand Savoie of Canada.

References

External links
 

Year of birth missing
Possibly living people
Iranian male boxers
Olympic boxers of Iran
Boxers at the 1948 Summer Olympics
Place of birth missing
Featherweight boxers